Impatiens etindensis is a species of flowering plant in the family Balsaminaceae. It is endemic to Cameroon, where it is known only from Mount Cameroon. It grows as an epiphyte on trees in mountain forest habitat.

References

Endemic flora of Cameroon
Plants described in 2009
etindensis
Taxonomy articles created by Polbot
Taxa named by Martin Cheek